Darvinte Parinamam is a 2016 Indian Malayalam-language action comedy film directed by Jijo Antony. It stars Prithviraj Sukumaran, Chemban Vinod Jose, Chandini Sreedharan, and Balu Varghese. Written by Manoj Nair, it revolves around the life of an ordinary man and a local goon, and how their lives are affected by some unfortunate events. The soundtrack and background score for the film is composed by Shankar Sharma. The film started rolling in Fort Kochi from 1 October 2015.

Produced jointly by Prithviraj, Santhosh Sivan, Arya, and Shaji Nadesan under the banner of August Cinema, Darvinte Parinamam was released on 18 March 2016. The film is about Anil Anto, a TV operator who moves to Kochi with his pregnant wife in order to start a new life. Here, post an unfortunate incident, Anil crosses paths with Darvin, a crime boss.

Plot
Anil Anto and his wife Amala shift from Kottarakara and settle down with the help of his friends in Kochi. They rent a small apartment and slowly settle down to their lives. Anil works for a cable TV company as a technician. "Gorilla" Darwin is a well known gangster, who, along with his brothers, rules the Kochi underworld. Meanwhile, Amala is pregnant, and she and her husband are very happy. During a drive by, Darvin's brother steals Amala's chain and pushes her down, causing a miscarriage. Their lives turn due to this incident. They complain to the police, but to no avail. During an installation, Anil sees the person who caused this problem. He chases them and gets into a fight. He brutally beats him up and takes him to the police. The police inspector is a cousin of Darvin and abuses Anil for beating up a culprit. He then calls up Darvin to come to pick up his brother. Darvin picks his brother from the police station and insults Anil by giving some money for Anil to get his wife a new chain. Anil slaps Darvin, which causes a scene. Darvin retreats back. Anil then faces Darvin's wrath. Darvin and the gang slowly steal every belonging from Anil and leave them with just an empty apartment. Anil loses all his possessions. A friendly policeman then explains that this is Darvin's style of reacting and he cannot do anything about it. After all this, Anil takes help from a small-time gangster to try to kidnap Darvin's child and fails spectacularly in a comedic fashion. They decide to kidnap Darvin's younger brother Gilli, who is a film buff. They make a ransom call to Darvin, only to be rebutted. While browsing through the photos on Gilli's phone, Anil finds the photo of a golden statue belonging to the church in their area. He realises that Darvin in the pretext of repairing the church has switched the golden one for a duplicate statue and holds the golden one in his chicken farm. Anil then steals this statue from the farm and starts negotiating with Darvin, knowing that Darvin has a deal fixed to sell this statue to a foreign customer. He asks Darvin to give him his stuff, not new but the exact items were stolen from him. Beginning a cat-and-mouse game, pushing Darvin's patience. The final item is Anil's bike, which was stolen from him and sold to Darvin's rival. Darvin fights with his rival Solomon to get the bike back. However, as Solomon tries to kill Darvin, Anil intervenes and helps Darvin out. Darvin initially plans to finish Anil for good once he tells him the location of the golden statue; however, he has a change of heart after Anil helps him out.
Then there is a big turn in events as Darvin and his goons are taken by the police for stealing the statue because Anil finked. The movie ends with Anil helping Darvin to convey his feelings to his love and marrying her.

Cast

 Prithviraj Sukumaran as Anil Anto 
 Chemban Vinod Jose as "Gorilla" Darwin 
 Chandini Sreedharan as Amala Anil
 Hannah Reji Koshy as Ancy
 Shammi Thilakan as Ayyappan aka "Kidnapper" Ayyappan
 Balu Varghese as Ravi
 Soubin Shahir as Willy
 Mamukkoya as Hassan Koya
 Sudhi Koppa as Apunni
 Poojappura Ravi as Priest
 Dharmajan Bolgatty as Ayyappan's ally
 Hareesh Perumanna as Ayyappan's ally
 Murugan Martin as Darwin's henchman
 Sethu Lekshmi as Anil's mother
 Subeesh Sudhi as "Negative" Thomman
 Vavita Vijayan as Princy
 Sajid Yahya as Dixon
 Sabumon Abdusamad as Jackson
 Jaffar Idukki as Majeed
 Pradeep Kottayam as Parthan
 Thesni Khan as Parthan's wife
 Poojappura Ravi as Priest
 Balaji Sarma as Police Constable
 Sumangal as Metro Rail Worker
 Binu Adimaly as Jayan
 Anjana Appukuttan as Valsamma
 Nandhu
 Akshara Kishor
 Manivarnan
 Lijo Jose Pellissery as himself
 Shaji Nadesan as Pranchi (cameo)

Music

The original songs were composed by Sankar Sharma, who had sung Athala Pithala song in Double Barrel (2015). Songs are labelled by Satyam Audios and were released on 3 March 2016.

Production 

Directed by Jijo Antony of Konthayum Poonoolum. Prithviraj Sukumaran and Chemban Vinod Jose does the lead roles, while Chandini Sreedharan was selected as the female lead against Prithviraj. Prithviraj, Santhosh Sivan, Arya, and Shaji Nadesan signed to produce the film under the production and distribution company August Cinema. Filming commenced on 1 October at Fort Kochi in Ernakulam.

Critical reception
The Times of India rated it 3.0 out of 5.0 and said "Director Jijo Anthony's Darvinte Parinamam might have a formulaic story of the protagonist leading a happy life till a villain wreaks havoc. The hero then evolves and seeks salvation. What makes this film different is the perspective from which it is intentionally told. The story and concept hold promise, but the execution falters due to the lack of clarity in the script and direction. The emotional turmoil that Prithviraj's character undergoes after a tragedy obviously has the audience rooting for him and sympathizing less for Darvin. The latter's perspective, crudely shown, seems diluted to glorify the movie's apparent hero".

'Nowrunning' rated it 2 out of 5 and said that 'Darvinte Parinamam' does put forward the buoyant suggestion every now and then that something better is lying in wait just around the corner. But it carries on babbling continually, almost as if not knowing when to stop, and at the end of it all, is left with nothing but a few sparsely delightful moments here or there.

References

External links

2010s Malayalam-language films
2016 films
Indian films about revenge
Films shot in Kochi
Films shot in Kollam
2010s action comedy-drama films
Indian action comedy-drama films